The Piper J-3 Cub is an American light aircraft that was built between 1938 and 1947 by Piper Aircraft. The aircraft has a simple, lightweight design which gives it good low-speed handling properties and short-field performance. The Cub is Piper Aircraft's most-produced model, with nearly 20,000 built in the United States. Its simplicity, affordability and popularity invokes comparisons to the Ford Model T automobile.

The aircraft is a high-wing, strut-braced monoplane with a large-area rectangular wing. It is most often powered by an air-cooled, flat-4 piston engine driving a fixed-pitch propeller. Its fuselage is a welded steel frame covered in fabric, seating two people in tandem.

The Cub was designed as a trainer. It had great popularity in this role and as a general aviation aircraft. Due to its performance, it was well suited for a variety of military uses such as reconnaissance, liaison and ground control. It was produced in large numbers during World War II as the L-4 Grasshopper. Many Cubs are still flying today. Cubs are highly prized as bush aircraft.

The aircraft's standard chrome yellow paint came to be known as "Cub Yellow" or "Lock Haven Yellow".

Design and development

The Taylor E-2 Cub first appeared in 1930, built by Taylor Aircraft in Bradford, Pennsylvania. Sponsored by William T. Piper, a Bradford industrialist and investor, the affordable E-2 was meant to encourage greater interest in aviation. Later in 1930, the company went bankrupt, with Piper buying the assets, but keeping founder C. Gilbert Taylor on as president. In 1936, an earlier Cub was altered by employee Walter Jamouneau to become the J-2 while Taylor was on sick leave. (The coincidence led some to believe that the "J" stood for Jamouneau, while aviation historian Peter Bowers concluded that the letter simply followed the E, F, G and H models, with the "I" omitted because it could be mistaken for the numeral one.). When he saw the redesign, Taylor was so incensed that he fired Jamouneau. Piper, however, had encouraged Jamouneau's changes and hired him back. Piper then bought Taylor's share in the company, paying him $250 per month for three years.

Although sales were initially slow, about 1,200 J-2s were produced before a fire in the Piper factory, a former silk mill in Bradford, Pennsylvania, ended its production in 1938. After Piper moved his company from Bradford to Lock Haven, Pennsylvania, the J-3, which featured further changes by Jamouneau, replaced the J-2.  The changes integrated the vertical fin of the tail into the rear fuselage structure and covered it simultaneously with each of the fuselage's sides, changed the rearmost side window's shape to a smoothly curved half-oval outline and placed a steerable tailwheel at the rear end of the J-2's leaf spring-style tailskid, linked for its steering function to the lower end of the rudder with springs and lightweight chains to either end of a double-ended rudder control horn. Powered by a 40 hp (30 kW) engine, in 1938, it sold for just over $1,000.

Several alternative air-cooled engines, typically flat-fours, powered the J-3 Cubs, designated J3C when using the Continental A series, J3F using the Franklin 4AC, and J3L with the Lycoming O-145. Very few examples, designated J3P, were equipped with Lenape Papoose 3-cylinder radial engines.

The outbreak of hostilities in Europe in 1939, along with the growing realization that the United States might soon be drawn into World War II, resulted in the formation of the Civilian Pilot Training Program (CPTP). The Piper J-3 Cub became the primary trainer aircraft of the CPTP and played an integral role in its success, achieving legendary status. About 75% of all new pilots in the CPTP (from a total of 435,165 graduates) were trained in Cubs. By war's end, 80% of all United States military pilots had received their initial flight training in Piper Cubs.

The need for new pilots created an insatiable appetite for the Cub. In 1940, the year before the United States entered the war, 3,016 Cubs had been built. Wartime demands soon increased that production rate to one Cub being built every 20 minutes.

Flitfire

	
Prior to the United States entering World War II, J-3s were part of a fund-raising program to support the United Kingdom. Billed as a Flitfire, a Piper Cub J3 bearing Royal Air Force insignia was donated by W. T. Piper and Franklin Motors to the RAF Benevolent Fund to be raffled off. Piper distributors nationwide were encouraged to do the same.  On April 29, 1941, all 48 Flitfire aircraft, one for each of the 48 states that made up the country at that time, flew into La Guardia Field for a dedication and fundraising event which included Royal Navy officers from the battleship HMS Malaya, in New York for repairs, as honored guests. At least three of the original Flitfires have been restored to their original silver-doped finish.

Operational history

World War II service

The Piper Cub quickly became a familiar sight. First Lady Eleanor Roosevelt took a flight in a J-3 Cub, posing for a series of publicity photos to help promote the CPTP. Newsreels and newspapers of the era often featured images of wartime leaders, such as Generals Dwight Eisenhower, George Patton and George Marshall, flying around European battlefields in Piper Cubs.

Civilian-owned Cubs joined the war effort as part of the newly formed Civil Air Patrol, patrolling the Eastern Seaboard and Gulf Coast in a constant search for German U-boats and survivors of U-boat attacks.

Piper developed a military variant ("All we had to do," Bill Jr. is quoted as saying, "was paint the Cub olive drab to produce a military airplane"), variously designated as the O-59 (1941), L-4 (after April 1942) and NE (U.S. Navy). The L-4 Grasshopper was mechanically identical to the J-3 civilian Cub, but was distinguishable by the use of a Plexiglas greenhouse skylight and rear windows for improved visibility, much like the Taylorcraft L-2 and Aeronca L-3 also in use with the US armed forces. It had accommodations for a single passenger in addition to the pilot. Some 5,413 L-4s were produced for U.S. forces, including 250 built for the U.S. Navy under contract as the NE-1 and NE-2.

All L-4 models, as well as similar, tandem-cockpit accommodation aircraft from Aeronca and Taylorcraft, were collectively nicknamed "Grasshoppers", though the L-4 was almost universally referred to by its civilian designation of Cub. The L-4 was used extensively in World War II for reconnaissance, transporting supplies, artillery spotting duties and medical evacuation of wounded soldiers. During the Allied invasion of France in June 1944, the L-4's slow cruising speed and low-level maneuverability made it an ideal observation platform for spotting hidden German armor waiting in ambush in the hedgerowed bocage country south of the invasion beaches. For these operations, the pilot generally carried both an observer/radio operator and a 25-pound communications radio, a load that often exceeded the plane's specified weight capacity. After the Allied breakout in France, L-4s were also sometimes equipped with improvised racks, usually in pairs or quartets, of infantry bazookas for ground attack (actually a form of top attack) against German armored units. The most famous of these L-4 ground attack planes was Rosie the Rocketer, piloted by Maj. Charles "Bazooka Charlie" Carpenter, whose six bazooka rocket launchers were credited with eliminating six enemy tanks and several armored cars during its wartime service, especially during the Battle of Arracourt. L-4s could also be operated from ships, using the Brodie landing system.

After the war, many L-4s were sold as surplus, but a considerable number were retained in service. L-4s sold as surplus in the U.S. were redesignated as J-3s, but often retained their wartime glazing and paint.

Postwar

An icon of the era and of American general aviation, the J-3 Cub has long been loved by pilots and nonpilots alike, with thousands still in use. Piper sold 19,073 J-3s between 1938 and 1947, the majority of them L-4s and other military variants. After the war, thousands of Grasshoppers were civilian-registered under the designation J-3. Sixty-five pre-war Taylor and Piper Cubs were assembled from parts in Canada (by Cub Aircraft Corporation Ltd.). After the war, 130 J-3C-65 models were manufactured in Hamilton, Ontario.  Sixteen L-4B models, (known as the Prospector), were later manufactured.  The last J-3 model was assembled from parts at Leavens Bros. Toronto in 1952. J-3 Cubs were also assembled in Denmark and Argentina and by a licensee in Oklahoma.

In the late 1940s, the J-3 was replaced by the Piper PA-11 Cub Special (1,500 produced), the first Piper Cub version to have a fully enclosed cowling for its powerplant and then the Piper PA-18 Super Cub, which Piper produced until 1981 when it sold the rights to WTA Inc. In all, Piper produced 2,650 Super Cubs. The Super Cub had a 150 hp (110 kW) engine which increased its top speed to 130 mph (210 km/h).

Korean War service
The L-4 was used extensively by both U.S. and South Korean Air Forces in the early 1950s.  During the Korean War, the L-4 was in service in many of the same roles it had performed during World War II, such as artillery spotting, forward air control and reconnaissance. Some L-4s were fitted with a high-back canopy to carry a single stretcher for medical evacuation of wounded soldiers.

Modern production
Modernized and up-engined versions are produced by Cub Crafters of Washington and by American Legend Aircraft in Texas, as the Cub continues to be sought after by bush pilots for its short takeoff and landing (STOL)  capabilities, as well as by recreational pilots for its nostalgia appeal. The new aircraft are actually modeled on the PA-11, though the Legend company does sell an open-cowl version with the cylinder heads exposed, like the J-3 Cub. An electrical system is standard from both manufacturers.

The J-3 is distinguished from its successors by having a cowl that exposes its engine's cylinder heads — the exposed cylinders of any J-3's engine were usually fitted with sheet metal "eyebrow" air scoops to direct air over the cylinder's fins for more effective engine cooling in flight. Very few other examples exist of "flat" aircraft engine installations (as opposed to radial engines) in which the cylinder heads are exposed. From the PA-11 on through the present Super Cub models, the cowling surrounds the cylinder heads.

A curiosity of the J-3 is that when it is flown solo, the lone pilot normally occupies the rear seat for proper balance, to balance the fuel tank located at the firewall. Starting with the PA-11, as well as some L-4s, fuel was carried in wing tanks, allowing the pilot to fly solo from the front seat.

Variants

Civil
J-3
J3C-40
Certified 14 July 1938 and equipped with a Continental A-40-4 or A-40-5 of 
J3C-50
Certified 14 July 1938 and equipped with a Continental A-50-1 or A-50-2 to -9 (inclusive) of 
J3C-50S
J3C-65
J3C-65S
J3F-50
Certified 14 July 1938 and equipped with a Franklin 4AC-150 Series 50 of 
J3F-50S
J3F-60
J3F-60S
J3F-65
Certified 7 August 1940 and equipped with a Franklin 4AC-176-B2 or a Franklin 4AC-176-BA2 of 
J3F-65S
J3L
J3L-S
J3L-65
Certified 27 May 1940 and equipped with a Lycoming O-145-B1, B2, or B3 of 
J3L-65S

J3P
Variant powered by a  Lenape LM-3-50 or Lenape AR-3-160 three-cylinder radial  engine
J-3R
Variant with slotted flaps powered by a  Lenape LM-3-65 engine.
J-3X
1944 variant with cantilever wing powered by a  Continental A-65-8 engine.
L-4B Prospector
Canadian manufactured model, with removable rear seat and control, additional capacity, optional extra fuel tank and painted in a PA-12 color scheme. 
Cammandre 1
A French conversion of J-3 Cub/L-4 aircraft
Poullin J.5AFive L-4 Cubs converted by Jean Poullin for specialist tasks.
Poullin J.5BA single L-4 Cub converted by Jean Poullin for specialist tasks
Wagner Twin CubA twin fuselage conversion of the J-3

Military
YO-59
 Four US Army Air Corps test and evaluation J3C-65
O-59
 Production version for the USAAC; 140 built later redesignated L-4
O-59A
 Improved version, powered by a 65-hp (48-kW) Continental O-170-3 piston engine; 948 built, later redesignated L-4A
L-4
 Redesignated YO-59 and O-59
L-4A
 Redesignated O-59A.
L-4B
 As per L-4A, but without radio equipment; 980 built
L-4C
 Eight impressed J3L-65s, first two originally designated UC-83A

L-4D
 Five impressed J3F-65s
L-4H
 As per L-4B but with improved equipment and fixed-pitch propeller, 1801 built
L-4J
 L-4H with controllable-pitch propeller, 1680 built
UC-83A
 Two impressed J3L-65s, later redesignated L-4C

TG-8
 Three-seat training glider variant, 250 built
LNP
 United States Navy designation for three TG-8s received.
NE-1
 United States Navy designation for dual-control version of J3C-65, 230 built
NE-2
 As per NE-1 with minor equipment changes, 20 built

Operators

Civil

The aircraft has been popular with flying schools — especially from the pre-World War II existence of the Civilian Pilot Training Program using them in the United States — and remains so with private individuals, into the 21st century.

Military

Royal Netherlands East Indies Army Air Force

Indonesian Air Force

Republic of Korea Air Force

Military of Paraguay - L-4

 Royal Thai Navy

Royal Air Force

United States Air Force
United States Army
United States Army Air Forces
United States Navy
Civil Air Patrol

Specifications (J3C-65 Cub)

See also

References

Bibliography

External links

 
 Fiddler's Green - history of the J-3
 Piper Aircraft, Inc. - History - Brief timeline of the history of Piper Aircraft, starting with the Piper Cub
 Sentimental Journey - Annual fly-in of Piper Cubs held in Lock Haven, Pennsylvania

High-wing aircraft
Single-engined tractor aircraft
Cub, J-3
1930s United States civil utility aircraft
1940s United States military utility aircraft
Aircraft first flown in 1938
Conventional landing gear